Across Europe and parts of Asia, unusually high-temperatures in the late-winter period were reported from February 20 until February 28, 2021. The onset of the short-lasting winter heat wave was caused by a jet stream of Saharan dust. Daily high temperatures for the period were similar to the maximum high temperatures during spring.

The capital of China, Beijing, also experienced the highest overall winter temperature: .

Areas affected

United Kingdom 
Warnings were set off across UK for not only the heatwave but a pollen bomb just shortly after the January 2021 coldwave went through UK and Europe.

Europe 
Sweden had set a record high temperature of  caused by the foehn wind.

Asia 
While Longzhou and Cao Bang both reached  on February 20. Pohang, South Korea surpassed its own  set in 2004 with a new  on February 21. In China, it was the warmest February recorded nationwide since 1961.

See also 
 2021 Russia heatwave
 2021 Western North America heat wave

References 

2021 heat waves
February 2021 events in Asia
February 2021 events in Europe
Heat waves in Asia
Heat waves in Europe
Heat waves in the United Kingdom
Winter heat waves